Carl Breeze (born 7 July 1979 in Kings Lynn) is a British auto racing driver. He is not to be confused with Hyla Breese, an Australian driver also with British Touring Car Championship experience. His racing heroes include Ayrton Senna, Nelson Piquet and Valentino Rossi. Breeze currently competes in the Ginetta GT Supercup.

Career

Early years
Breeze won 3 major British karting titles before moving up to car racing. He began his car racing career in British Formula Ford with a best result of 2nd in his debut season in 1996. For 1998 Breeze competed in Formula Palmer Audi and competed in two races in the French GT Championship before moving into Formula Renault for 1999. In 2001 he was champion, with results which were stronger than Kimi Räikkönen's the previous year, although unlike Kimi he had experience of the championship and its circuits.

British Touring Car Championship

He made a move to tin-top racing in 2002, joining Vic Lee's team for rounds 4–10 of the BTCC in an independent Peugeot 406 Coupe. He signed for a full season in their self-developed Peugeot 307 in 2003, but moved to the GA team's Vauxhall Astra mid-season. He remained with the team for 2004 racing both the Astra and an Alfa Romeo, with an assortment of team-mates including Stefan Hodgetts, Kelvin Burt and Gavin Smith.

SEAT and Ginetta
For 2005 he moved to the SEAT Cupra Championship with the Barwell team, finishing 4th overall with one with and 10 podiums. For 2006 he raced for Edenbridge as team-mate to Tom Ferrier, and continued in the SEAT Cupra competition.

When SEAT ended the championship after the 2008 season, Breeze switched to the Ginetta G50 series in 2009 where he ended the year third in the driver standings – an impressive effort after sustaining a leg injury during an early-season race at Oulton Park. In 2010, he remained in Ginetta G50 and finished the season as Vice-Champion. Breeze also raced in one round of the GT4 European Cup in 2010 driving a Ginetta G50 GT4 with co-driver Frank Wrathall.

For 2011 the Ginetta G50 Cup became the Ginetta GT Supercup and Breeze challenged for the title again in the new Ginetta G55, but lost out by 5 points in the championship to Adam Morgan. He will continue to race in the Ginetta GT Supercup in 2012 racing for Tollbar Racing.

Breeze had a disastrous start to the 2012 season and the task looked near-impossible with a deficit of almost 120 points after just 3 rounds. With the title in mind Carl move back to his old TCR team and put together a sensational campaign charge. A run of 18 podiums out of a possible 19, which included 6 wins saw Breeze secure the Championship in the last race of the season at Brands Hatch. Long time sponsor Blue Chip Customer Engineering Ltd have put together a 2012 season highlights page 

In 2013, a last-minute deal meant that Breeze was able to return to defend his 2012 championship, remaining with TCR. A season-opening win at Brands Hatch Indy circuit saw the campaign get off to a good start, followed by two more wins at Donington Park in rounds 4 and 5.

At the third meeting of the season at Thruxton on 4/5 May, Carl nearly scored maximum points by taking wins in rounds 7 and 8, and a 2nd-place finish in round 9, having lost the lead of that race to Tom Ingram on the penultimate lap.

Racing record

Complete British Touring Car Championship results
(key) Races in bold indicate pole position (1 point awarded – 2002 all races, 2003–2004 just for first race) Races in italics indicate fastest lap (1 point awarded all races) * signifies that driver lead race for at least one lap (1 point given – 2002 just in feature race, 2003–2004 all races)

Complete Ginetta G50 Cup results
(key) (Races in bold indicate pole position – 1 point awarded just in first race; races in italics indicate fastest lap – 1 point awarded all races;-

Complete Ginetta GT/GT4 Supercup results
(key) (Races in bold indicate pole position – 1 point awarded just in first race; races in italics indicate fastest lap – 1 point awarded all races;-

24 Hours of Silverstone results

References

External links
 Profile

1979 births
English racing drivers
British Formula Renault 2.0 drivers
British Touring Car Championship drivers
Living people
Formula Palmer Audi drivers
Formula Ford drivers
Britcar 24-hour drivers
Ginetta GT4 Supercup drivers
United Autosports drivers
GT4 European Series drivers